Bheron Prasad was  an Indian politician. He was a Member of Parliament, representing Madhya Pradesh in the Rajya Sabha the upper house of India's Parliament as a member of the Indian National Congress.

References

Rajya Sabha members from Madhya Pradesh
Indian National Congress politicians
1900 births
Year of death missing